The Late Late Tribute Shows are a series of special editions of the world's longest-running chat show, The Late Late Show broadcast on RTÉ One in Ireland each Friday evening.

History
Over decades the shows have featured a broad range of well-known public figures including Micheál Mac Liammóir, Joe Dolan, Maureen Potter, Michael O'Hehir, Brian Lenihan, Jimmy Magee, Christy Moore, Mike Murphy and Paul McGrath.

In 1999, there was a special programme marking six months since the Omagh bombing and there was also a special show in the wake of 9/11. There were also tribute shows celebrating Irish music and a Late Late Show special devoted to Irish comedians. Individual bands and musicians to have been given a tribute show include The Clancy Brothers and Tommy Makem, The Chieftains, The Dubliners, U2, Westlife and, most recently, Ronnie Drew himself.

The Tribute Shows, along with the Toy Show, tends to be one of the few editions of The Late Late Show to require advance preparation before the week of broadcast.

Tribute list

See also
List of The Late Late Show episodes

References

External links
 Official site

Tribute Shows
1967 Irish television series debuts
RTÉ original programming